Küre Mountains (formerly  İsfendiyar Mountains)  is a mountain range in the Black Sea Region, Turkey. It stretches close and parallel to the central part of the southern coast of the Black Sea.

See also
 Küre Mountains National Park

Mountain ranges of Turkey
Black Sea Region
Important Bird Areas of Turkey